Kevin Richard Hershberger  (born September 7, 1973) is an American film director, film producer, and screenwriter.
Hershberger. was born in Indianapolis, Indiana and grew up in Maryland.  He attended the Virginia Military Institute (1995) and majored in International Studies and History.  He then served as a Military Intelligence Officer in the United States Army for eight years.  He currently lives in Richmond, Virginia.  Hershberger is president of LionHeart FilmWorks and is best known for his first feature film, Wicked Spring (2001) which he wrote, directed and produced.

Notable works
For television, Hershberger has directed several broadcast series including Legends & Lies, and Deadly Shootouts. (REELZ Channel); Killer Kids; Triggers: Weapons That Changed the World and America: Facts Vs Fiction.
In December 2014 Hershberger directed the Discovery Networks mini-series The American Revolution for which Kevin was nominated for "Outstanding Lighting Direction & Scenic Design". at the 36th Annual News & Documentary Emmy Awards.
Also in 2014 Kevin was Co-Producer, Costume Designer and Historical Advisor for the Civil War feature film Field of Lost Shoes starring Tom Skerritt, Jason Isaacs and Lauren Holly   He worked again as Producer, Costume Designer and Historical Advisor for the theatrical feature Josephine from writer and director Rory Feek.
Hershberger has continued to direct and produce museum films as well as multi-part documentary series for world-wide TV and home entertainment release through Mill Creek Entertainment such as:  Up From Slavery; Emancipation Road; Carbon Leaf, Monsters Among Us; Gangster Empire: Rise of the Mob; The Ultimate Civil War Series.; NASA: A Journey Through Space.; and Vietnam: 50 Years Remembered.

Crew work

Films
Josephine 
Field of Lost Shoes
Let It Begin Here
Wicked Spring

Television
Siege of Yorktown
Up from Slavery
Friedrich Wilhelm von Steuben
Legends & Lies: The Real West
Legends & Lies: The Civil War
Legends & Lies: The Patriots
Deadly Shootouts
America: Facts Vs. Fiction
The American Revolution 
Killer Kids 
Church Secrets & Legends 
Triggers: Weapons That Changed the World
For Love of Liberty

References

External links
Official Homepage

1973 births
American male film actors
American male screenwriters
American male television actors
American television directors
Television producers from New York (state)
American television writers
Living people
People from Greater Los Angeles
Film directors from California
American male television writers
Screenwriters from New York (state)
Screenwriters from California